Dailly is a village in South Ayrshire, Scotland. "New Dailly", as it was originally known, was laid out in the 1760s as a coal-mining village. In 1849 a fire broke out in Maxwell Colliery, one of the nearby mines, and continued to burn for 50 years.

Notable people
Thomas Thomson FRSE (1768-1852) antiquary and friend of Walter Scott
Hamilton Paul (1773–1854), church minister, poet and writer
Thomas's younger brother, John Thomson of Duddingston FRSE (1778 – 1840) minister at Dailly 1800-1805 and artist  
Hew Ainslie (1792–1878), poet
Anne Hepburn, missionary was born here in 1925
Tommy Lawrence, footballer
Ross McCrorie, footballer who plays with Aberdeen
Robby McCrorie footballer who plays with Rangers
Allan Dorans Member of Parliament for Ayr, Carrick and Cumnock,since December 2019

References

External links
Video of the Mermaids of Carrick on old gravestones

Villages in Carrick, Scotland